ZZ Top: A Tribute from Friends is the fourth tribute album to honor American blues-rock band ZZ Top. It includes performances from Daughtry, Nickelback, Wolfmother, Filter and Steven Tyler of Aerosmith among others.

Background information
The album includes 11 cover tracks such as "Gimme All Your Lovin'," "Legs," a combination of two songs "Waitin' for the Bus"/"Jesus Just Left Chicago" and "La Grange."

Reception

Upon release, ZZ Top: A Tribute from Friends debuted at number 121 on the Billboard 200, and number 8 on the Top Hard Rock Albums, selling 4,000 copies. The album also debuted at number 151 on the Canadian Albums Chart.

Track listing

References

2011 compilation albums
ZZ Top tribute albums
RCA Records compilation albums
Hard rock compilation albums